Automata II is the ninth studio album by American progressive metal band Between the Buried and Me. It was released on July 13, 2018 through Sumerian Records, and it is the second part of a two-piece album, the first one being Automata I, which was released March 9, 2018.
The band also announced that they would perform at The Summer Slaughter Tour.

Background
On the release of the album, vocalist Tommy Giles Rogers Jr. stated:

Through his official Facebook page, Blake Richardson also talked about the album:

Bassist Dan Briggs added:

Critical reception

Review aggregator Metacritic scored the album an 81 out of 100 based on four music critics, citing "universal acclaim".

Allmusic's Thom Jurek claimed that "Automata II can be listened to on its own, but it holds much greater power when taken together with its predecessor. It is easily the more musically adventurous of the two recordings, making it an indispensable part of Between the Buried and Me's provocative catalog.

Victor Giol of The Prog Report stated that "This will please both the longtime fans as well as new listeners; a very well done feather in BTBAM’s prog concept album cap. Automata is sure to be a top prog album of 2018".

Track listing

Personnel

Between the Buried and Me
 Tommy Giles Rogers Jr. – vocals, keyboards
 Paul Waggoner – lead guitar
 Dustie Waring – rhythm guitar
 Dan Briggs – bass
 Blake Richardson – drums

Additional musicians
 Cameron MacManus – baritone sax, trombone
 Jonathan Wiseman – trumpet

Production
 Jamie King – production, engineering, drum and piano engineering
 Kevin King – additional production
 Jens Bogren – mixing, mastering
 Kris Hilbert – drum and piano engineering

Management
 Nick "Biggie" Grimaldi (Good Fight Entertainment) – management
 Ash Avildsen and Nick Walters (Sumerian Records) – A&R
 Dave Shapiro and Tim Borror (The Agency Group) – North America booking
 Tom Taaffe (The Agency Group) – international booking
 Bryan K. Christner, Esq. – legal representation

Artwork
 Corey Meyers – art direction, layout, photography
 Aaron Strelecki and Andrew Strelecki – photography

Charts

References

2018 albums
Between the Buried and Me albums
Sumerian Records albums
Concept albums
Albums produced by Jamie King (record producer)
Sequel albums